Wanderson Romão, Ph.D. granted in 2010, is a Brazilian chemist, who is active in the fields of analytical chemistry and forensic science; he is a professor of the Instituto Federal do Espírito Santo (Ifes).

Awards 
 Prize for the best article in forensic sciences - Brazilian Society of Forensic Sciences (2016).

References

Literature 
 Patrícia Scalzer: Criança embarca em voo para Vitória, mas acaba, por engano, em Curitiba // Globo Comunicação e Participações, 3 December 2016.
 UFES cria técnica para identificar com mais eficácia arma usada em crime // JORNAL NACIONAL, 13 May 2014.

Web-sources 
 

Living people
Year of birth missing (living people)
Brazilian chemists
State University of Campinas alumni